The Pan American Games sports comprise all the sports contested in the Summer Olympic Games. In addition, traditional and popular sports throughout the Americas which are not contested at the Olympic Games are also contested such as bowling and baseball. As of 2015, the Pan American Games included 36 sports with 51 disciplines and 364 events. The number and kinds of events may change slightly from one Pan American Games to another.

Sports, disciplines, events
For purposes of Pan American Games competition, the Pan American Sports Organization (PASO) makes a distinction between sports and disciplines. A sport, in Pan American Games terms, is a single or group of disciplines as represented by an international governing body, namely an International Federation. For example, aquatics, represented at the Olympic level by the International Swimming Federation, is a sport at the Pan American Games that includes the swimming, diving, synchronized swimming and water polo disciplines.

Every Summer Olympic discipline is currently on the Pan American Games program. The last such discipline to be added was canoe slalom, which made its debut in 2015 in Toronto, Canada. The discipline had been scheduled to be held at both the 2007 and 2011 Pan American Games, but had been dropped both times due to the small number of competing countries. The Games also include some disciplines which have never been contested at a Summer Olympics. Examples can be found in baseball and softball, now considered a single Pan Am Games sport due to sharing a single international federation. Both were last contested in the Olympics in 2008 and will return in 2020, but baseball has been strictly for men and softball for women. In the Pan Am Games, men's softball has been on the program on several occasions, most recently in 2015; women's baseball made its debut in 2015.

Medals are awarded on a per-event basis; there can be one or more events per sport or discipline. In fact, every current Pan American Games discipline has at least two events.

Changes

The Pan American Games charter establishes that they comprise the program of the Games, the 28 compulsory sports of the program of the Olympic Games plus seven sports recognized by the entity, due to its popularity in the American continent, if a new sport becomes Olympic it is automatically added to the program of the Pan American Games. This only happens, if the number of national federations in the Americas is sufficient. In the same way that it happens in the Universiade, the Organizing Committee of the each edition can request the inclusion of new sports or disciplines, respecting the local demands. An example of this is the removal of the Basque pelota in the program of the Games of 2007 and 2015 and its replacement respectively by futsal. and the woman's baseball tournament.

Until the 2011 Games in Guadalajara, just one olympic event was never held, the canoe slalom. The event was planned to be held in the 2007 and 2011 editions, but was eventually canceled due to the low number of entries. Thus, the event was held for the first time at the 2015 Games.

Previous Pan American Games have included sports which are no longer present on the current program, like futsal and polo.

The International Olympic Committee voted on October 9, 2009, during the 121st IOC Session in Copenhagen, to elevate both rugby sevens and golf as official Olympic sports and to include them in the Olympics, beginning with the 2016 Olympic Games. 
With this development, rugby sevens made its debut at the 2011 Pan American Games in Guadalajara, and golf was played at the 2015 Pan American Games before becoming an Olympic sport.
In 2015, as a result of a request from the organizing committee, PASO decided to include surfing in the 2019 Pan American Games program. The following year, a few days before the opening ceremony of the 2016 Summer Olympics, surfing was integrated to the 2020 Summer Olympics program.

Current Pan American Games program
The following sports (or disciplines of a sport) make up the current Pan American Games official program and are listed alphabetically according to the name used by PASO. The figures in each cell indicate the number of events for each sport contested at the respective Games; a bullet denotes that the sport/discipline was scheduled to be competed, but was dropped due to a lack of entries.

Nine of the 39 sports (Aquatics, Basketball, Canoeing, Cycling, Football, Gymnastics, Volleyball, Equestrian and Wrestling) consist of multiple disciplines. Disciplines from the same sport are grouped under the same heading:

For equestrian and wrestling, the figures in each cell indicate the number of events for each sport, and not for each discipline separately.

Multiple new sports and events were added to the next edition of the games in 2023. The new sports are breaking, skateboarding and sport climbing.

The following sports have been contested at the Pan American Games:

Discontinued sports
The following sports were previously part of the Pan American Games program as official sports, but are no longer on the current program.

Winter sports

Related article

References

 
Sports at multi-sport events by competition